Unclaimed Baggage is an anthology of 21 short stories based from the author members of the Main Line Writers Group published in 2013 by White Lightning Publishing. The collection is of mixed genres with the common thread that all have been written by then-members of the group.

The book was the result of a two-year effort to promote the group and its writers. The book has a foreword written by Taylor Mason, Emmy Award winning comedian, ventriloquist and author, and introduction by Gary Zenker, founder and leader of the group.

Contributors
 Jane Butler 
 Sarah Cain
 Judy Chow
 Tony Conaway
 Susan Drummond
 Julie Duffy
 Suzanne Feathers
 Joan Hill
 Tom Joyce
 Walter Lawn
 Lorinda Lende
 Brian Mahon
 Bill McCambley
 Matthew McGeehin
 Robert Charles Mercer
 Martha Nawrocki
 Susanna Reilly
 Thomas Jay Rush
 Elizabeth Stolar
 William Young

References

Comedy books
2013 anthologies
American anthologies
Fiction anthologies